The  is a body of salt water surrounded by Fukuoka, Saga, Nagasaki, and Kumamoto Prefectures, all of which lie on the island of Kyūshū in Japan. It is the largest bay in Kyūshū. Isahaya Bay is a branch of the Ariake Sea. Across the Amakusa Islands lies the Yatsushiro Sea.

Many harbors are located on the coast of the Ariake Sea. Among them are Misumi (in the city of Uki, Kumamoto Prefecture), Shimabara (Shimabara, Nagasaki), Taira (Unzen, Nagasaki), Nagasu (Nagasu, Kumamoto), Kumamoto (Kumamoto, Kumamoto), Miike (Omuta, Fukuoka), Kuchinotsu (Minamishimabara, Nagasaki), and Oniike (Amakusa, Kumamoto). Five ferry routes cross the Ariake Sea.

Various species of fauna, including mudskippers, pen shells (Atrina pectinata), and fiddler crabs, live in the Ariake Sea. In autumn, the Suaeda halophyte shichimenso (Suaeda japonica) grows along the shore.

The Ariake Sea is used for aquaculture, with nori being a major product. Recent years have brought increasing pollution, with resultant red tides. There is ongoing land reclamation, as evidenced by satellite imagery, despite government attempts to dissuade farmers from carrying out the activity.

See also 
 Shiranui (optical phenomenon)
 Kashima Gatalympics
 1792 Unzen earthquake and tsunami

External links
有明海総合研究プロジェクト "Ariake Sea General Research Project" (Saga University, in Japanese)
有明海等環境情報・研究ネットワーク "Environmental Information on Ariake Etc.: Research Network" (Japan Fisheries Resource Conservation Association, in Japanese)

Bays of Kyushu
Kyushu region
Ōmuta, Fukuoka
Bays of the Pacific Ocean
Landforms of Fukuoka Prefecture
Landforms of Saga Prefecture
Landforms of Nagasaki Prefecture
Landforms of Kumamoto Prefecture